Espas may refer to the following places:

 Espas, Gers, France
 Espas, Zanjan, Iran

See also
 Aspas, Fars, Iran
 Ispas, Ukraine